Aster is a genus of perennial flowering plants in the family Asteraceae. Its circumscription has been narrowed, and it now encompasses around 170 species, all but one of which are restricted to Eurasia; many species formerly in Aster are now in other genera of the tribe Astereae. Aster amellus is the type species of the genus and the family Asteraceae.

The name Aster comes from the Ancient Greek word  (astḗr), meaning "star", referring to the shape of the flower head. Many species and a variety of hybrids and varieties are popular as garden plants because of their attractive and colourful flowers. 'Aster' species are used as food plants by the larvae of a number of Lepidoptera species—see list of Lepidoptera that feed on Aster. Asters can grow in all hardiness zones.

Circumscription

The genus Aster once contained nearly 600 species in Eurasia and North America, but after morphologic and molecular research on the genus during the 1990s, it was decided that the North American species are better treated in a series of other related genera. After this split there are roughly 180 species within the genus, all but one being confined to Eurasia.

The New World species have now been reclassified in the genera Almutaster, Canadanthus, Doellingeria, Eucephalus, Eurybia, Ionactis, Oligoneuron, Oreostemma, Sericocarpus and Symphyotrichum, though all are treated within the same tribe, Astereae. The "China aster" is in the related genus Callistephus. Regardless of the taxonomic change, most are still widely referred to as "asters", or "Michaelmas daisies", because of their typical blooming period.

Species

Plants of the World Online accepts 10 species, as of June 2022. The species formerly known as Aster tripolium (sea aster) is now Tripolium pannonicum. The species formerly known as Aster linosyris (goldilocks) is now Galatella linosyris. Many species and a variety of hybrids and varieties are popular as garden plants because of their beautiful, attractive and colourful flowers. Aster species are used as food plants by the larvae of a number of Lepidoptera species—see list of Lepidoptera that feed on Aster. Asters can grow in all hardiness zones.

Some species are:

Aster ageratoides – rough-surface aster
Aster alpinus – alpine aster
Aster altaicus
Aster amellus – European Michaelmas daisy, Italian aster
Aster arenarius – beach-sand aster
Aster bellidiastrum
Aster fastigiatus – highly-branch aster
Aster glehnii – Ulleungdo aster
Aster hayatae – Korean montane aster
Aster hispidus
Aster iinumae – perennial false aster
Aster incisus – incised-leaf aster
Aster lautureanus – connected aster, mountain aster
Aster maackii – Maack's aster
Aster magnus – magnus aster
Aster neoelegans
Aster quitensis
Aster spathulifolius – seashore spatulate aster
Aster tataricus – Tatarian aster, Tatarinow's aster
Aster tonglingensis
Aster tongolensis
Aster yomena

Hybrids and cultivars
Those marked  have gained the Royal Horticultural Society's Award of Garden Merit.
Aster × frikartii (A. amellus × A. thomsonii) Frikart's aster
Aster × frikartii 'Mönch' 
A. × frikartii 'Wunder von Stäfa' 
'Kylie' (A. novae-angliae 'Andenken an Alma Pötschke' × A. ericoides 'White Heather') 
'Ochtendgloren'  (A. pringlei hybrid)
'Photograph'

In history
The Hungarian revolution of 31 October 1918, became known as the "Aster Revolution" due to protesters in Budapest wearing this flower.

In culture
One of the few flowers left around Michaelmas in the British Isles is the Michaelmas daisy (another name for asters), hence the rhyme: "The Michaelmas daisies, among dead weeds, Bloom for St Michael's valorous deeds..."

References

 
Asteraceae genera
Garden plants
Taxa named by Carl Linnaeus